Water polo was contested at the 2017 Summer Universiade from August 18 to 31 in Taipei, Taiwan.

Medal summary

Medal table

Medal events

Men

16 teams participated in the men's tournament.

Teams

Pool A

Pool B

Pool C

Pool D

Women

12 teams participated in the women's tournament.

Teams

Pool A

Pool B

References

External links
2017 Summer Universiade – Water polo
Result book – Water polo

 
2017
U
2017 Summer Universiade events